Epitaphios of Grand Prince Dmitry Shemyaka is an epitaphios donated to the Yuriev Monastery by the family of Dmitry Shemyaka. It dates back to 1444. The work is kept in the Novgorod Museum-Reserve.

Description
The epitaphios depicts Christ in the tomb and four angels. It is a contribution of Dmitry Shemyaka, his wife Sofiya Dmitrievna and son Ivan to the Yuriev Monastery as evidenced by the inscription on the edge of the fabric.

The materials of the epitaphios are taffeta, gold thread, silver thread, silk thread, canvas; its size is 183 × 124,5 cm.

References

1444 paintings
15th century in Russia
Russian icons
Paintings depicting the Entombment of Christ
Veliky Novgorod